The 1886 Prince Edward Island election was held on 30 June 1886 to elect members of the House of Assembly of the province of Prince Edward Island, Canada. It was won by the Conservative party.

References
 

Elections in Prince Edward Island
1886 elections in Canada
1886 in Prince Edward Island
June 1886 events